Edward Hoad (4 September 1925 – 13 June 2012) was a Barbadian cricketer. He played in nine first-class matches for the Barbados cricket team from 1944 to 1954.

See also
 List of Barbadian representative cricketers

References

External links
 

1925 births
2012 deaths
Barbadian cricketers
Barbados cricketers
People from Saint Thomas, Barbados